Acanthomyrmex ferox is a species of ant that belongs to the genus Acanthomyrmex. It was described by Emery in 1893, and is found in Malaysia and Thailand.

References

ferox
Insects described in 1893
Insects of Malaysia
Insects of Thailand